Tacacoma is a location in the La Paz Department in Bolivia. It is the seat of the Tacacoma Municipality, the third municipal section of the Larecaja Province.

References 

  Instituto Nacional de Estadistica de Bolivia  (INE)

Populated places in La Paz Department (Bolivia)